Prague 15 is a municipal district (městská část) in Prague, Czech Republic. It is located in the south eastern part.

The administrative district (správní obvod) of the same name comprises municipal districts Prague 15, Horní Měcholupy, Dolní Měcholupy, Dubeč, Petrovice and Štěrboholy.

Twin city 
  Harlow, United Kingdom
 Žilina, Slovakia

See also
Districts of Prague#Symbols

External links 
 Prague 15 - Official homepage

Districts of Prague